Škopljak is a village in the municipality of Gračišće in Istria, Croatia.

According to the 2001 Croatian census, the village had 71 inhabitants and 21 family households.

References

Populated places in Istria County